The Grammy Award for Best Melodic Rap Performance (awarded as Best Rap/Sung Collaboration until 2017, and Best Rap/Sung Performance from 2018 to 2020) is an honor presented at the Grammy Awards, a ceremony that was established in 1958 and originally called the Gramophone Awards, to recording artists for quality songs on which rappers and singers collaborate. Honors in several categories are presented at the ceremony annually by the National Academy of Recording Arts and Sciences of the United States to "honor artistic achievement, technical proficiency and overall excellence in the recording industry, without regard to album sales or chart position".

The name and definition of the category were changed in June 2020, with immediate effect, to represent the inclusivity of the growing hybrid performance trends within the rap genre. According to the Recording Academy, "This category is intended to recognize solo and collaborative performances containing elements of rap and melody over modern production. This performance requires a strong and clear presence of melody combined with rap cadence, and is inclusive of dialects, lyrics or performance elements from non-rap genres including R&B, rock, country, electronic or more. The production may include traditional elements of rap or elements characteristic of the aforementioned non-rap genres."

The award goes to the artist(s). The producer, engineer and songwriter can apply for a Winners Certificate.

American rapper Eve and American singer Gwen Stefani won the first award in 2002 with "Let Me Blow Ya Mind". The pair were also nominated a second time in 2006 for "Rich Girl". American rapper Jay-Z has received seven Grammys in the category— four times as lead artist and three times as featured artist; he has also been nominated for three other songs. Rihanna is the female artist with the most wins in the category, with five wins out of nine total nominations.

Recipients

 Each year is linked to the article about the Grammy Awards held that year.

Artists with multiple wins

7 wins
 Jay-Z

5 wins
 Rihanna
 Kanye West

2 wins
 Kendrick Lamar
 Justin Timberlake
 Krayzie Bone
 Drake

Artists with multiple nominations

15 nominations
 Kanye West

12 nominations
 Jay-Z

9 nominations
 Rihanna

8 nominations
 Beyoncé 

7 nominations
 Drake
 John Legend

6 nominations
 Kendrick Lamar

5 nominations
 Eminem
 T-Pain
 Justin Timberlake
 Lil Wayne

4 nominations
 Common
 J. Cole
 Ludacris

3 nominations
 Chris Brown
 DJ Khaled
 Kelly Rowland 
 Lil Baby
 SZA
 T.I.
 Travis Scott

2 nominations
 6lack
 Akon
 André 3000
 Ashanti
 Nate Dogg
 Snoop Dogg
 The-Dream
 Missy Elliott
 Eve
 Flo Rida
 Future
 GoldLink
 Jamie Foxx
 Fergie 
 Anthony Hamilton
 Jack Harlow
 Ja Rule
 Lil Nas X
 Nelly
 Pharrell
 Roddy Ricch
 Gwen Stefani
 The Weeknd
 Charlie Wilson

See also
 Grammy Award for Best Rap Performance by a Duo or Group
 Grammy Award for Best Rap Solo Performance
 Grammy Award for Best Rap Song

References

General
 
 

Specific

External links
Official site of the Grammy Awards

2002 establishments in the United States
Awards established in 2002
Rap Sung Collaboration
 
Musical collaboration awards